The Lansing Wolves were a junior ice hockey team a member of the United States Premier Hockey League (USPHL) as part of the Premier Division. The team played its home games at the Summit Sports and Ice Complex in Dimondale, Michigan, a suburb of Lansing. The franchise was previously a member of the North American 3 Hockey League (NA3HL) from 2010 to 2018 as the Battle Creek Jr. Revolution and the West Michigan Wolves.

History 
The team began as the Battle Creek Jr. Revolution in 2010 joining the independent Northern Junior Hockey League (NJHL) for the 2010–11 season. In August 2010, with rumors of the league folding, the Jr. Revolution left the NJHL and joined the USA Hockey-sanctioned Tier III Central States Hockey League. The Jr. Revolution replaced the Grand Rapids Owls, who suspended operations, as the 12th team in the Central States Hockey League. In November 2010, the CSHL changed its name to the North American 3 Hockey League after the Tier II North American Hockey League took over operations of the CSHL.

The team ownership was initially the Revolution Advertising LLC. until acquired by Dr. Joseph Burkhardt in 2014. On April 1, 2014, the team re-branded itself as the West Michigan Wolves.

In 2017, the franchise relocated the Lansing suburb of Dimondale, Michigan, and were renamed Lansing Wolves.

In 2018, the Wolves left the NA3HL for United States Premier Hockey League's Premier Division, a non-sanctioned league. During the COVID-19 pandemic, the Wolves were not listed as members of the USPHL prior to the 2020–21 season. In February 2021, their home arena in Dimondale, Summit Sports and Ice Complex, closed.

Season-by-season records

References

External links
 Lansing Wolves Website

Amateur ice hockey teams in Michigan
2010 establishments in Michigan
Ice hockey clubs established in 2010
Sports in Lansing, Michigan